Den Hoorn can refer to:

 Den Hoorn, South Holland, a town in the municipality Midden-Delfland in the province South Holland in the Netherlands.
 Den Hoorn, North Holland, a town on the island Texel in the province North Holland in the Netherlands.
 Wehe-den Hoorn, a merger of the village Wehe and Den Hoorn.
 a former village in South Holland; now part of Zoetermeer.

See also
 Horn (disambiguation) 
 Hoorn (disambiguation)

fr:Hoorn (homonymie)#Den Hoorn